Synaphea gracillima is a shrub endemic to Western Australia.

It is found in the Peel, South West and Great Southern regions of Western Australia between where it grows in sandy-gravelly soils over laterite.

References

Eudicots of Western Australia
gracillima
Endemic flora of Western Australia
Plants described in 1839